Guamaggiore, Gomajori or Goi Maiori in sardinian language, is a comune (municipality) in the Province of South Sardinia in the Italian region Sardinia, located about  north of Cagliari.  
Guamaggiore borders the following municipalities: Gesico, Guasila, Ortacesus, Selegas. It is home to the Gothic church of St. Peter, dating to the 13th-14th century.

References 

Cities and towns in Sardinia